The  is a 155 mm self-propelled howitzer of the Japanese Ground Self-Defense Force, which was developed as the successor to the Type 75 155 mm self-propelled howitzer.

History
Research and development for a successor to the Type 75 155 mm self-propelled howitzer started in 1985. The new weapon would have a 155 mm gun barrel 52 calibers long (L52) instead of the 30 calibers (L30) barrel of the Type 75, and would mount the latest fire-control system. Japan Steel Works was the primary contractor, developing and manufacturing the main gun and turret. Mitsubishi Heavy Industries was tasked to design the chassis.

The designing stage cost 5 billion yen and was completed in 1992. After various technical and practical tests, the first vehicle was delivered to the training division of Japan Ground Self-Defense Force in 1999.

Characteristics
The Type 99 uses a modified chassis from the Mitsubishi Type 89 IFV, lengthened with an additional road wheel. It has a 52 caliber gun barrel. The secondary armament consists of a roof-mounted .50 caliber (12.7 mm) machine gun, fitted with a shield. The armor provides protection against small arms fire and artillery shell splinters. The vehicle is powered by a diesel engine, providing 600 horsepower. A travel lock for the gun is mounted on the front of the hull, which folds back onto the glacis plate when not in use. The howitzer is resupplied from the Type 99 ammunition resupply vehicle.

Operators 
Japan

 Japan Ground Self-Defense Force
 Fuji School
 Fuji School(Combined Training)Brigade
 JGSDF Artillery School Unit
 Ordnance School
  Northern Army
 2nd Division
 2nd Artillery Regiment(Mechanized)
 5th Brigade
 5th Artillery Unit
 7th Division
 7th Artillery Regiment(Mechanized)
 11th Brigade
 11th Artillery Unit (Mechanized)
 Northern Army Combined Brigade
 1st Sergeant Training Unit

Similar vehicles
 AS-90
 AHS Krab
 Msta-S 2S19
 Panzerhaubitze 2000
 K-9 Thunder
 PLZ-05

References

155 mm artillery
Self-propelled howitzers of Japan
Tracked self-propelled howitzers
Military vehicles introduced in the 1990s